Elgin is a rural locality in the Isaac Region, Queensland, Australia.

Geography 
Epping Forest National Park is in the south-east of the locality. Apart from the national park, the land use is almost entirely grazing on native vegetation.

History 

Education 
There are no schools in Elgin, nor nearby. Distance education or boarding school would be options.

References 

Isaac Region
Localities in Queensland